Italy competed at the 1990 European Athletics Championships in Split, Yugoslavia, from 26 August to 2 September 1990.

In this edition of the European championships, Italy reached (updated to 2018), the best ranking with the 4th place, like Prague 1978, and the maximum number of medals total (12) and gold medals won (5).

Medalists

Top eight

Men

Women

See also
 Italy national athletics team

References

External links
 EAA official site 

 

Italy at the European Athletics Championships
Nations at the 1990 European Athletics Championships
1990 in Italian sport